Rohinton Soli "Ronnie" Screwvala (born 8 September 1956) is an Indian entrepreneur.

He has been named on Esquire's List of the 75 Most Influential People of the 21st Century and ranked 78 among the 100 most influential people in the world on the Time 100 (compiled by Time Magazine, 2009).  He was also listed amongst 25 Asia's Most Powerful people by Fortune Magazine.

Based in Mumbai, India, Ronnie pioneered cable television, built a Media and Entertainment conglomerate (UTV Software Communications) that partnered with News Corp, 20th Century Fox, The Walt Disney Company and Bloomberg and later in 2012, he divested the company to Disney for an enterprise value of US$1.4 billion.

From 2013 onwards, he and his wife scaled their Non-Profit The Swades Foundation whose goal is to work with a million people in rural India, empower them and move them out of poverty every 6–7 years and then move to another geography.

He has co-founded UpGrad which is into Online Education in the higher education and specialization sector, built a Sports company (U Sports) spanning Football / E Sports and Kabaddi, re-entered the media content space to build a creative content company in Movies and Digital Content (RSVP),  authored a Book titled Dream with Your Eyes Open and through his investment company Unilazer Ventures he has been a significant private equity investor in Indian start ups with early stage investment and significant minority stakes.

Early life and education
Screwvala was born in Bombay into a Parsi family. His father was an executive at the British firm J L Morrison and Smith & Nephew. Screwvala schooled and went to college in Mumbai at Cathedral and John Connon School and Sydenham College. Screwvala had a keen interest in theatre while in school and acted in professional plays with Bombay theatre as a hobby. He played notable roles in Shakespeare’s Othello and Death of a Salesman.

Personal life
Screwvala is married to Zarina Mehta, his second marriage. Zarina has been a co-founder in the media company UTV they founded, and now is the co-Trustee of their Philanthropic foundation; The Swades Foundation. They live in Breach Candy, South Mumbai. His first wife, Manjula Nanavati and Screwvala have one daughter, Trishya Screwvala, who runs her own Not For Profit, The Lighthouse Project, and who is married to sports commentator Suhail Chandhok.

Early days
Opportunistic in the early days of his entrepreneurship, Screwvala founded a toothbrush manufacturing company. Screwvala's is also credited with pioneering Cable TV in India (1981) at a time when there was a single terrestrial channel (Doordarshan) and grew that to multiple cities and most of the hotel chains in India.

He hosted a quiz show Mashoor Mahal in Doordarshan in 1985.

United Television (UTV) 1990-2012
Screwvala founded UTV and over the period grew it into a media conglomerate spanning a leading movie studio, a Games Studio and creative content company that went public and listed on stock exchanges in 2005  and into which Disney gradually took a substantial stake until he divested the whole company to them in 2012.

2013 onwards

The Swades Foundation
Along with his wife Zarina, Ronnie has founded The Swades Foundation, named after the acclaimed film he produced,  whose goal is to lift a million people out of poverty.

Presently, Swades is active in Raigad district in the state of Maharashtra in two thousand villages and involving half a million people. It is working on Water, Sanitation, Health, Education and the main focus is on Livelihood opportunities.

upGrad
Screwvala co-founded upGrad, which is one of the largest Online Education companies in India - focused on the higher Education and Specialization sector. They focus majorly on Digital Marketing, Data Analytics, Digital Technology Management, Data Driven Management and Product Management. upGrad has tie-ups with several colleges including MICA.

USports
Screwvala co-founded U Sports with a focus on three sports, Kabaddi a popular sport in India and around Asia (his team U Mumba is one of the top teams in the 12 team ProKabaddi League), E Sports and in Football where under the brand U Dreams the focus is to train and manage talent under various years of age for a sustained duration, and then manage their careers for the long term to play professionally in India and globally.

RSVP Movies
RSVP Movies is Screwvala's re-entry into the media and entertainment industry. This time is focussed on developing its own scripts and screenplays and working with directors that share the common vision of storytelling.

Unilazer

Unilazer was incorporated by Screwvala as a public equity company that has made investments in the Indian new economy companies with early stage investments with significant minority stake as also bringing with him his entrepreneurial experience to the founders. The sectors in which Unilazer has invested range from e commerce to a leading online eyewear company in India, and from AI and Bots to Agriculture to Microhousing Finance.

Filmography

Films
The following is a list of films produced/ co-produced by Screwvala

Television

Awards

References

Parsi people from Mumbai
1956 births
Living people
Film producers from Mumbai
Indian film distributors
Indian television producers
Filmfare Awards winners
Tamil film producers
20th-century Indian businesspeople
21st-century Indian businesspeople
Indian investors